Eugene is an unincorporated community in extreme southwestern Cole County, Missouri, United States. As of the 2020 census, the population is 140.

Eugene was founded in 1904, and named after Eugene Simpson, the original owner of the town site.  A post office called Eugene has been in operation since 1904.

Demographics

References

Unincorporated communities in Cole County, Missouri
Jefferson City metropolitan area
Unincorporated communities in Missouri